The Ravenna School District, formally the Ravenna City School District, is a public school district located in Ravenna, Ohio, United States.  The district serves students in preschool through 12th grade living in Ravenna and Ravenna Township, and small portions of Shalersville and Charlestown townships.

Schools
Ravenna High School, grades 9–12
Brown Middle School, grades 5–8
Ravenna Intervention School for Exceptional Students (RISE), grades 5–12
West Main Elementary School, grades 3–4
Willyard Elementary School, grades 1–2
West Park Elementary School, kindergarten
Ravenna Preschool, preschool

The previous district organization was adopted in February 1997 and implemented at the beginning of the 1997–98 school year. Prior to 1997, students in grades K–5 attended one of five neighborhood elementary schools, grades 6–8 were at Brown Middle School, and grades 9–12 at Ravenna High School. The changes in 1997 moved all kindergarten students to West Park Elementary School, and all fifth and sixth grade students to Rausch Intermediate School, adjacent to Brown Middle School, which became a school for grades seven and eight. Students who had previously attended West Park were split between Carlin and West Main Elementary Schools. This organization stayed in place until 2008 when Rausch Intermediate closed, necessitating the return of students in grade five to their neighborhood elementary school and grade six to Brown Middle School. When Tappan Elementary closed in 2013, students were sent to one of the three remaining elementary schools with most being assigned to West Main.

The current district organization, which centralizes each grade level at a specific building rather than have neighborhood elementary schools, was implemented beginning in the 2020–21 school year. Carlin Elementary School closed at the end of the 2019–20 school year, and all elementary buildings were repurposed. Kindergarten remained at West Park Elementary School, while students in 1st and 2nd grades were assigned to Willyard Elementary School and all students in 3rd and 4th grades assigned to West Main Elementary School. 5th graders were moved to Brown Middle School, while the Ravenna Preschool was moved to the former Carlin Elementary School, along with district offices. The Ravenna Intervention School for Exceptional Students, RISE, was established at the former Rausch Intermediate School building in 2019.

Former schools
Rausch Intermediate School, grades 5 and 6 (closed after the 2007–08 school year). Since 2019, the building serves as the home of the Ravenna Intervention School for Exceptional Students (RISE), a school for students in grades 5 through 12 with autism, learning disabilities, attention deficit hyperactivity disorder (ADHD), emotional disorders, and other conditions.
Tappan Elementary School, grades 1–5 (closed after the 2012–13 school year). The building is being leased by Education Alternatives.
Carlin Elementary School, grades 1–5 (closed after the 2019–20 school year). Since 2020, the building serves as the district's preschool program and houses some of the central office staff.

References

External links 

Education in Portage County, Ohio
School districts in Ohio
School districts established in 1853